The Registrar of the University of Oxford is one of the senior officials of the university. According to its statutes, the Registrar acts as the "head of the central administrative services", with responsibility for "the management and professional development of their staff and for the development of other administrative support". The Registrar is also the "principal adviser on strategic policy" to the university's Vice-Chancellor and Council, its main decision-making body.

The university regards the role as having a 550-year history, as there are references in the records to officials carrying out the duties of a registrar in the 15th century, though the list of Registrars published by the university in the 19th century begins with John London, who died in 1508. As the administrative requirements of the university have increased, so have the number of staff employed in the university administration under the Registrar. The university decided to give the role increased importance after this was recommended by a commission in 1922.

, there are 16 administrative sections for the university, and the heads of 12 of these report to the Registrar. About 4,000 of the university's staff of approximately 8,000 are under the Registrar's control. The current Registrar, Gill Aitken, took up her duties in September 2018. The previous Registrar, Ewan McKendrick, held the post from 1 January 2011; he is also Professor of English Private Law and was previously one of the university's Pro-Vice-Chancellors. His predecessor, Julie Maxton, was the first woman to hold the position; she was previously Dean of the Law School at the University of Auckland.

History and duties
The list of former Registrars published by the university in the 19th century begins with John London, who died in 1508. Records show that there were people before London carrying out similar tasks in the 15th century, and the university regards the role as having a 550-year history. There is a record of a resolution by the university, of uncertain date in the 15th century, that a registrar or scribe should be appointed to draft letters, record the university's public acts, copy its documents, and record the names of graduates. The position carried an annual salary of four marks (£2 13 shillings and 4 pence); fees had to be paid to the Registrar by individuals obtaining their degrees or recording other permissions granted by the university. In 1448, a John Manyngham signed a letter for the university, and was permitted in 1451 to have a scholar make transcripts in the university's library; one historian of the university says that Manyngham may have been Oxford's first Registrar. John Farley, who signed his name in Greek letters as a sign of his erudition, carried out the duties from 1458 to 1464.

In 1588, the Registrar had to be paid four pence by a student wishing to be admitted to the degree of Bachelor of Arts, six pence for a Master of Arts degree and eighteen pence for a doctorate; in 1601, the fees for the bachelor's and master's degrees were raised to six pence and eight pence. In the 16th century, it was regarded as a lucrative position and Thomas Caius, who held the post for 17 years, reacted violently when the university voted to remove him from office for failing to carry out his duties for a year, leading to his temporary imprisonment. By the 19th century, the stipend was fixed at £600 and the Registrar no longer personally received fees paid by students.

The workload of the Registrar has increased over time as the university has increased in size and complexity. In 1914, the Registry had a staff of five; there were eight staff members in 1930 and forty in 1958. Typewriters were rare before 1925 and there was, until then, no diary of recurring dates, with everything depending (in the words of a later Registrar, Sir Douglas Veale, appointed in 1930) "on someone—generally the registrar's secretary—happening to remember." A commission headed by the prime minister H. H. Asquith recommended in 1922 that Oxford should improve its administration and that the Registrar should become a more significant figure; Veale's appointment was a recognition of this need. In addition, external pressures from the requirements of the University Grants Committee and other governmental funding mechanisms also required more work from the Registrar and staff. As the historian Brian Harrison put it, under Veale (Registrar 1930–1958), Oxford's administration was "edging ... slowly from decentralized amateurism towards centralized professionalism." However, Veale's successor Sir Folliott Sandford was "appalled at the amount of paper", which was "quite beyond [his] conception as a civil servant." The growth in Oxford's administration led to a move in 1968 to purpose-built accommodation in Wellington Square: until that time, the administration had been housed in the Clarendon Building in the centre of Oxford next to the Bodleian Library. , there are 16 administrative sections for the university, and the heads of 12 of these report to the Registrar. In 2006, about 4,000 of the university's staff of approximately 8,000 were reported as being under the Registrar's control.

The university's statutes state that the Registrar is the "head of the central administrative services", with responsibility for "the management and professional development of their staff and for the development of other administrative support". The Registrar is also the "principal adviser on strategic policy" to the university's Vice-Chancellor and Council (its main decision-making body). Other duties include oversight of "the University's external relations", responsibility for "communications which express the general policy of the University", and control of the university's records and publications. Before 1997, when amendments were made to set out the modern duties of the post, the statutes relating to the Registrar were predominantly an outdated list of record-keeping duties; a requirement for the Registrar to live in an official residence provided by the university was deleted at this time. Julie Maxton (2006–10) was the first woman to hold the position; she was previously Dean of the Law School at the University of Auckland. She was succeeded on 1 January 2011 by Ewan McKendrick, formerly Professor of English Private Law at Oxford and one of the university's Pro-Vice-Chancellors. Some but not all of the Registrars have been appointed to a Fellowship of one of the colleges at the university; unlike some of the professorships at Oxford, the position is not linked to a particular college.

Registrars
In the table below, "college" indicates the college or hall of the university (if any) at which the individual held an official position, such as a fellowship, when serving as Registrar.

See also

Registrary, the equivalent position at the University of Cambridge

Notes

References
Bibliography

 Cited in references as Foster, 1500–1714.

Citations

Lists of people associated with the University of Oxford
15th-century establishments in England